The New Zealand women's cricket team toured the West Indies in September and October 2022 to play three Women's One Day Internationals (WODIs) and five Women's Twenty20 Internationals (WT20Is). All the matches were played at the Sir Vivian Richards Stadium in Antigua. The WODI matches formed part of the 2022–2025 ICC Women's Championship.

The first ODI was scheduled to be held on 16 September, but was postponed to 19 September and the rest of the matches were rescheduled due to the impact of Tropical Storm Fiona.

Squads

Shamilia Connell was added to West Indies' squad before the 4th T20I.

WODI series

1st WODI

2nd WODI

3rd WODI

WT20I series

1st WT20I

2nd WT20I

3rd WT20I

4th WT20I

5th WT20I

References

External links
 Series home at ESPNcricinfo

2022 in West Indian cricket
2022 in New Zealand cricket
International cricket competitions in 2022–23
New Zealand cricket tours of the West Indies
New Zealand 2022-23